The Papakura Museum is a local museum created to recognise and honour the history of Papakura, Drury, and surrounding districts. This has historically included Franklin, Manurewa, Clevedon, and Kawakawa Bay, as well as other neighbourhoods and districts nearby. The Papakura Museum is a community based museum founded by the members of the Papakura & Districts Historical Society (PDHS). The Museum's permanent exhibition focuses on local history through text, image and artefact displays. The Military Gallery focuses on local military history. Each year the Museum curates four temporary feature exhibitions that run from 2-4 months and include a variety of topics and themes.

History

In 1961, the Hunua branch of the Federated Farmers proposed the formation of a historical society to the Papakura Borough Council. Councillors Ernie Clarke and Deryck Milne were selected to begin work on the proposal and on December 6th, 1961, an initial planning meeting was attended by twenty-nine members of the community. The first official meeting of the historical society then took place on March 20th, 1962. 

The late Ernest "Ernie" Clarke became the first president of the historical society (1962-1966), was heavily involved in the process of establishing the Museum, wrote and edited many of the Museum and historical society's publications, and originally the museum was named and dedicated to his memory.   

In February of 1972, the Papakura Council granted the PDHS two rooms in a house at 33 Coles Cresent to house artefacts that had been collected by the society. Artefacts had previously been housed in society members' private homes. In September of 1972, the first exhibition of the society's collection was held at this location in collaboration with the Papakura Potters Society. In 1973, the museum opened to the public on Wednesday afternoons. In 1977, the public hours were extended to include Sunday afternoons as well.  

In November of 1982, after the fire brigade moved to new premises, the museum moved into the vacated fire station on Averill Street. Three years later in November of 1985, the museum opened a research and archive room to researchers and anyone else interested in using this resource.  

After several months of delays, the museum moved again and officially opened on August 31st, 1999. The Papakura District Council built a community education complex called 'Accent Point House' at 209 Great South Road. This building was created to house the Sir Edmund Hillary Library, a schools resource centre, and the Papakura Museum. Originally located on the 4th floor of this complex the museum would eventually move downstairs to the 3rd floor in October of 2010. 

In 2017, the museum opened a dedicated Military Gallery space. This gallery is used to display information and artifacts about the wars and conflicts that have involved New Zealand. These range from the New Zealand Wars to present day peace-keeping operations. This gallery also houses the museum's permanent display of the Costar brothers' WWI artifact collection. This exhibit includes a touch-screen interactive display about the brothers' correspondence during their deployment.

Exhibitions

Publications

The museum has been involved in the creation of several publications. 

To coincide with the opening of the fire station location of the museum, Breakwater Against the Tide was published. The author, Elsdon Craig, details the history of Papakura.  Two years later in 1984, the museum published the first edition of Town Growing Up by Ernest Clarke, with a second edition published in 1993. In 1986, Clarke edited They Come and They Go which was a booklet published by the PDHS. Then in 1990, Big Hats, Scent Pots and Old Joe was published in conjunction with the Papakura Council for the New Zealand 1990 Project. In 1995, Papakura was declared a borough of Auckland, and the PDHS proposed that there should be a compiled history of the district from 1938 to the present. In 1997, Papakura: The Years of Progress 1938 - 1997 was published to chronicle Papakura history starting with the population explosion that happened when men returning from WWII brought their families to the area. 

In 2011, the first edition of Open All Hours; Main Street Papakura c1865 - c1938 was published by the museum. This publication looks at the importance of the town's main street, as well as including information and anecdotes about some of the business owners and workers. The second edition was published in 2016. The next publications in 2015, Thirteen Ships - The Waikato Immigration Scheme, 1864 - 1865 and "Digging Up the Past: Papakura Cemetery Heritage Walk", were both published as part of the Auckland Council Heritage Festival that year. In 2016, Dr Michelle Smith published "About Town - Heritage Walk, Great South Road, Papakura" which was supplemented by a guided walking brochure that Rob Finlay created for the previous year's Heritage Festival.  

In 2020, a companion booklet was created for the 'Art of War' exhibit. The next year Alibi Press published a children's book called The Takapuna Tram. Collated by Terry Carson, a poem by Elizabeth Welsman Dawson was used with illustrations by Elva Leaming. The book was designed by Anna Egan-Reid and produced by Mary Egan Publishing. In 2022, "Lens on Papakura" was published as a companion book to the temporary exhibition of the same name that was held at the museum during the same time.

References

See also
 Papakura District
Papakura Train Station

External links
Papakura Museum website
Papakura Museum blog

Museums in Auckland
Local museums in New Zealand
Papakura Local Board Area